Arleta High School (AHS) is a secondary school located on Van Nuys Boulevard in the Arleta section of Los Angeles, California, United States in the San Fernando Valley.

History
The school opened on October 3, 2006, serving grades 9 through 10 during its first year of operation. It is part of the Los Angeles Unified School District. The school phased in grade 11 in the  fall of 2007 and grade 12 in the fall of 2008. In June 2009, the first class graduated.

The school houses three small schools: Social Justice (SJ), Science Math and Related Technologies (SMART), and Visual and Performing Arts (VAPA).

All three schools utilize block scheduling where students take four 82-minute classes a day. Students finish a year's study in sixteen weeks. Arleta High School is recognized as one of the California Gold Ribbon Schools by the California Department of Education.

Throughout the 4-year term, students are required to create a portfolio of all of their academic successes and present it in order to graduate and participate in the graduation ceremony. Transfer students must complete an essay of their academic success from their previous high school(s) and continue to complete their portfolio as much as possible.

On Tuesdays the school encourages students to dress professionally as a preparation in career seeking, many benefits include good participation grading, priority to receive lunch, certificates and more.

Athletics

Arleta High School Athletics is part of the East Valley League of the CIF Los Angeles City Section. Fall sports include football, girls volleyball, cross country. Winter sports include basketball and soccer. Spring sports include track and field, softball, baseball, boys volleyball, and cheer. Arleta High School's dance team performs and trains all year round.

Notable alumni
 Jonathan Porter - rapper

Public Appearances
 On My Block (TV Series)
 Freeridge (TV Series)

References

External links

 Arleta High, usnews.com

Los Angeles Unified School District schools
Arleta, Los Angeles
High schools in the San Fernando Valley
High schools in Los Angeles
Public high schools in California
Educational institutions established in 2006
2006 establishments in California